Zhang Hu ( – ) was a Chinese poet of the mid-Tang dynasty. His courtesy name was Chengji.

After travelling to the capital of Chang'an, Zhang was unsuccessful in seeking a position at court. He spent the latter half of his life travelling to famous places and composing poetry. The majority of his surviving poems are on historical topics and famous places he visited in his travels.

Biography 
Zhang Hu was born in 792, in Qinghe (modern Qinghe County, Hebei or Shandong) or possibly Nanyang (modern Nanyang, Henan). His courtesy name was Chengji.

Zhang flourished between 820 and 845. Living early on in Gusu, in the Changqing era (821–824) he was summoned to the capital Chang'an on the recommendation of Linghu Chu. Linghu had known Zhang through the 810s, and his recommendation memorial was submitted along with 300 of Zhang's poems. However, he failed to find employment at court due to the opposition of Yuan Zhen, who claimed Zhang lacked literary talent. Zhang moved to Huainan, where he spent his days visiting famous temples and places of scenic beauty and devoting himself to poetry composition.

Later, Zhang retired to Danyang (modern Danyang, Jiangsu), where spent the rest of his days as a private citizen. He likely died in 852 or 853.

Poetry 
Roughly 350 of Zhang's poems have survived, most of which are based on famous temples and places of scenic beauty that he visited in his travels. He primarily wrote quatrains on historical topics. There is an anthology of his poetry called the Zhang Chushi Shiji.

Zhang wrote a dozen poems on the reign of Xuanzong, of which the following notably deals with the emperor's relationship with an older sister of Yang Guifei:

Among Zhang's better-known poems is the  "Jinshan-si":

{|align=center cellpadding="5" cellspacing="1" style="border:1px solid black; background-color:#e7e8ff;"
|- align=center bgcolor=#d7a8ff
|-
!Traditional||Simplified||Pinyin
|- valign=top
|
一宿金山寺，超然離世群。
僧歸夜船月，龍出曉堂雲。
樹色中流見，鐘聲兩岸聞。
翻思在朝市，終日醉醺醺。
|
一宿金山寺，超然离世群。
僧归夜船月，龙出晓堂云。
树色中流见，钟声两岸闻。
翻思在朝市，终日醉醺醺。
|
yī sù jīn shān sì, chāo rán lí shì qún.
sēng guī yè chuán yuè, lóng chū xiǎo táng yún.
shù sè zhōng liú jiàn, zhōng shēng liǎng àn wén.
fān sī zài zhāo shì, zhōng rì zuì xūn xūn.|-
|}

Five of Zhang's poems were included in the Three Hundred Tang Poems.

 Notes 

 References 

 Works cited 
 
 Mair, Victor H. (ed.) (2001). The Columbia History of Chinese Literature. New York: Columbia University Press. . (Amazon Kindle edition.)
 
 
 

 External links 
Books of the Quan Tangshi'' that include collected poems of Zhang Hu at the Chinese Text Project:
Book 510
Book 511

790s births
853 deaths
9th-century Chinese poets
Poets from Hebei
Politicians from Xingtai
Tang dynasty politicians from Hebei
Three Hundred Tang Poems poets